The spinysnout pipefish (Halicampus spinirostris) is a species of marine pipefish of the family Syngnathidae. It is found in the Indo-Pacific, from Sri Lanka to Samoa, and from Japan and the Marshall Islands to central Australia. It is expected to feed on small crustaceans, similar to other pipefish. This species is ovoviviparous, with males carrying eggs in a brood pouch before giving birth to live young.

Identification
H. spinirostris is pale to dark brown coloured, with four alternating thick dark and thin white bars. It can be recognized by its distinctive spines on the snout.

References

Further reading
WoRMS  
IUCN Seahorse, Pipefish & Stickleback Specialist Group

Fish described in 1981
Taxa named by Charles Eric Dawson
Taxa named by Gerald R. Allen
spinirostris
Marine fish